This is an inclusive list of science fiction television programs whose names begin with the letter T.

T
Live-action
Taken (2002, miniseries)
Tales from the Darkside (1983–1988, anthology)
Tales from the Loop
Tales of the Unexpected (1979–1988, UK, anthology)
Tales of Tomorrow (1951–1953, anthology)
Target Luna (franchise):
Target Luna (1960, UK) IMDb
Pathfinders in Space (1960, UK, Target Luna sequel) IMDb
Pathfinders to Mars (1960–1961, UK, Pathfinders in Space sequel) IMDb
Pathfinders to Venus (1961, UK, Pathfinders to Mars sequel) IMDb
Tattooed Teenage Alien Fighters from Beverly Hills (1994)
Teen Titans (franchise):
Teenage Caveman (2002, film)
Ninja Turtles: The Next Mutation a.k.a. NT:TNM (1997–1998)
TekWar (franchise):
Tekwar a.k.a. Tekwar: The Movie (1994, Canada/US, first film)
TekWar: TekLords a.k.a. TekLords (1994, Canada/US, second film)
TekLab (1994, Canada/US, third film)
TekJustice a.k.a. Tekjustice: The Final Showdown (1994, Canada/US, fourth film)
TekWar (1995–1996, Canada/US)
Tenchi Muyo! (franchise) (elements of science fiction):
Terminator: The Sarah Connor Chronicles (2008–2009)
Terra Nova (2011)
Terrahawks (1983–1986, UK, puppetry)
Tetsujin 28-go (1960, Japan)
That Was Then (2002)
They Came from Outer Space (1990–1991)
Third Eye, The (1981–1983, anthology)
This Is Not My Life (2010, New Zealand)
Three-Body Problem, The (franchise):
Three-Body (2023, China)
Three-Body Problem, The (2023)
Three Moons Over Milford (2006)
Threshold (2005–2006)
Thunderbirds (1965–1966, UK, puppetry)
Thunderstone (1999–2000, Australia)
Tick, The (2001–2002) (elements of science fiction)
Time After Time (2017)
Time Express (1979) (elements of science fiction)
Time Riders (1991, UK) IMDb
Time Trax (1993–1994)
Time Tunnel, The (franchise):
Time Tunnel, The (1966–1967)
Time Travelers (1976, remake, pilot, film)
Time Tunnel, The (2002, pilot)
Timecop (1997–1998)
Timelapse (1980, Australia) IMDb
Timeless (2016–2018)
Timeslip (1970, UK)
Timestalkers (1987, film)
Tin Man (2007, miniseries)
Titans (2018-present)Tom Corbett, Space Cadet (1950–1955)Tom Smothers' Organic Prime Time Space Ride (1971) IMDbTommyknockers, The (1993, miniseries)
Tomorrow People, The (franchise):Tomorrow People, The (1973–1979, UK)Tomorrow People, The (1992–1995, Canada)Tomorrow People, The (2013–2014)Total Recall 2070 (1999, Canada)Tracker (2001–2002, Canada)
Tremors (franchise):Tremors (2003)Tremors 4: The Legend Begins (2004, prequel, film)Triangle, The (2005, miniseries)
Tribe, The (franchise):New Tomorrow, The (2006, New Zealand, Tribe, The sequel)Tribe, The (1999–2003, New Zealand)Tripods, The (1984–1985, UK/Australia)Tru Calling (2003–2005) (elements of science fiction)Travelers (2016–2018, Canada)Turnabout (1979) IMDbTwice in a Lifetime (1999–2001, Canada)
Twilight Zone, The (anthology) (franchise):Twilight Zone, The (1959–1964, anthology)Twilight Zone, The (1985–1989, anthology)Twilight Zone, The (2002-2003, anthology)Twilight Zone, The (2019-2020, anthology)
 Twisted Tales (1996)

AnimatedTales from the Cryptkeeper (1993–1997, anthology, animated)Team Galaxy a.k.a. Le Collège de l'Espace (France) a.k.a. Galaxie Académie (Canada) (2006–2007, France/Italy/Canada, animated)
Teen Titans (franchise):Teen Titans (2003–2006, animated)New Teen Titans (2012, animated)Teen Titans Go! (2013–present, animated)
Teenage Mutant Ninja Turtles a.k.a. TMNT (franchise):Teenage Mutant Ninja Turtles (1987–1996, US/Japan, animated)Teenage Mutant Ninja Turtles (2003–2009, animated):Teenage Mutant Ninja Turtles: Turtles Forever a.k.a. TMNT: Turtles Forever (2009, animated film)Teenage Mutant Ninja Turtles (2012–2017, animated)Rise of the Teenage Mutant Ninja Turtles (2018-2020, animated)
Tekkaman (franchise):Tekkaman: The Space Knight (1975, Japan, animated)Tekkaman Blade a.k.a. Teknoman (1992–1993, Japan, animated)Tenchi Universe (1995, Japan, animated)Tenchi in Tokyo (1997, Japan, animated)Tenchi Muyo! GXP (2002, Japan, animated)Terra Formars (2014, Japan, animated)
Tetsujin-28 (franchise):Tetsujin 28-go (1963–1966, Japan, animated)Gigantor (1963–1966, US, adaptation, animated)Shin Tetsujin 28-go (1980–1981, Japan, animated) a.k.a. New Adventures of Gigantor, The (US)Tetsujin 28 FX (1992–1993, Japan, animated)Tetsujin-28 (2004, Japan, animated)Tetsuwan Birdy: Decode (2008–2009, Japan, animated)Texhnolyze (2003, Japan, animated)Thundarr the Barbarian (1980–1982, animated)
ThunderCats (franchise):ThunderCats (1985–1990, animated)ThunderCats (2011–2012, US/Japan, animated)Tick, The a.k.a. Tick: The Animated Series, The (1994–1996, animated) (elements of science fiction in some episodes)Tide-Line Blue (2005, Japan, animated)
Time Bokan (franchise):Time Bokan (1975–1976, Japan, animated)Yatterman (1975–1979, Japan, animated, spin-off)Zenderman (1979–1980, Japan, animated)Rescueman (1980–1981, Japan, animated)Yattodetaman (1981–1982, Japan, animated)Gyakuten! Ippatsuman (1982–1983, Japan, animated)Itadakiman (1982–1983, Japan, animated)Time Bokan 2000: Kaitou Kiramekiman (2000, Japan, animated)Yatterman (2008–2009, Japan, animated, remake)Time Jam: Valerian & Laureline (2007–2008, France/Japan, animated)Time Squad (2001–2003, animated)Time Warp Trio (2005–2006, animated)Titan Maximum (2009, stop-motion animation)TO (2009, Japan, television OVA, animated)
Toaru Majutsu no Index (franchise):Toaru Majutsu no Index (2008–2011, Japan, animated)A Certain Scientific Railgun (2009–2010, Japan, animated)Tokyo Underground (2002, Japan, animated)
Toonami: Total Immersion Events a.k.a. TIEs (franchise) (animated):Intruder, The (2000, interactive, special, micro-series, animated)Lockdown (2001, interactive, special, micro-series, animated)Trapped in Hyperspace (2002, interactive, special, micro-series, animated)Immortal Grand Prix a.k.a. IGPX (2003, Japan/US, interactive, special, micro-series, animated)Immortal Grand Prix a.k.a. IGPX (2005–2006, Japan/US, animated)Tōshō Daimos (1978–1979, Japan, animated)Toward the Terra (2007, Japan, animated)Toxic Crusaders (1991, animated)
Transformers (franchise):Transformers, The a.k.a. Transformers: Generation 1 a.k.a. Transformers: G1 (1984–1987, animated)Transformers: Generation 2 a.k.a. Transformers: G2 (1993–1995, modified Transformers: G1 rebroadcast, animated)Transformers: The Headmasters (1987–1988, Japan, animated)Transformers: Super-God Masterforce (1988–1989, Japan, animated)Transformers: Victory (1989, Japan, animated)Beast Wars: Transformers (1996–1999, animated)Beast Wars II: Chō Seimeitai Transformers a.k.a. Beast Wars II: Super Life-form Transformers (1998, Japan, animated)Beast Wars Neo (1998–1999, Japan, animated)Beast Machines (1998–2000, Canada/US, animated)Transformers: Robots in Disguise (2000–2001, Japan/US, animated) a.k.a. Transformers: Car Robot (Japan)Transformers: Armada a.k.a. Super Robot Lifeform Transformers: Micron Legend (2001–2003, Japan, animated)Transformers: Energon a.k.a. Transformers: Superlink (2004–2005, Japan, animated)Transformers: Cybertron a.k.a. Transformers: Galaxy Force (2005–2006, Japan, animated)Transformers Animated (2007–2009, US/Japan, animated)Transformers: Prime a.k.a. Transformers: Prime – The Animated Series (2010–2012, US/Japan, animated)Transformers: Rescue Bots (2012–2016, US/Japan, animated)Transformers: Robots in Disguise (2015–2017, animated)Transformers: Cyberverse (2018-2020, animated)Trider G7 (1980–1981, Japan, animated)Trigun (1998, Japan, animated)Tripping the Rift (2004–2007, Canada, animated)Tron: Uprising (2012–2013, animated)Tytania'' (2008–2009, Japan, animated)

References

Television programs, T